Beth Shimmin (born 18 March 1987 in Adelaide, South Australia) is an Australian netball player. She played with the Adelaide Thunderbirds (2007) in the Commonwealth Bank Trophy, and as of 2009 was part of the Thunderbirds' extended training squad in the ANZ Championship.

References

1987 births
Living people
Australian netball players
People from Adelaide
Australian Netball League players
Southern Force (netball) players
Adelaide Thunderbirds players
Netball players from South Australia
University of Adelaide alumni